Thomas Gyles (fl. 1402–1406) of Dover, Kent, was an English politician.

Family
He was the son of John Gyles, also an MP for Dover and Mayor of Dover. The name of Thomas' mother is unrecorded. At some point before February 1413, Thomas married a woman named Martha.

Career
He was a Member (MP) of the Parliament of England for Dover in 1402 and 1406. He was mayor of Dover in 1406–1408 and 1413–14.

References

14th-century births
15th-century deaths
English MPs 1402
Mayors of Dover
English MPs 1406